Dimitris Pittas (born 8 April 1958) is a Greek former professional footballer who played as midfielder.

Club career
Pittas started playing football as an amateur at GS Patision in 1974. He won the local championship and he also became an international with the youth team in 1976. In 1981 he moved to Ethnikos Piraeus, where he played for four seasons and his performances attracted the interest of the big clubs. In 1985, Pittas was transferred to the PAOK and played at the club of Thessaloniki until December 1986. In December of 1986, Pittas moved to AEK Athens and performed quite well, helping the team with his good technique and strong shot. On 24 January 1988, in a match against PAOK and while the score was at 0–0, at the 30th minute AEK won an indirect foul from quite a long distance and Pittas had not seen the gesture of the referee for an indirect foul, he executed directly with the ball hitting the goalkeeper's hand and ending up in the net. If the goalkeeper had let the ball go straight to the net, the goal would not count. PAOK objected, asking for the replay of the match but,  the objection fell on deaf ears. As he revealed, when the players and the referee were returning after the goal for the continuation of the match, the referee angrily addressed him and asking him if he was trying to end his refereeing career. On 7 September 1988, he scored the winner with a header against Athletic Bilbao for the UEFA Cup. He distinguished himself quite a bit in the yellow-blacks, actively participating in winning the league in 1989. An interesting story of that time is that he won a bet of 500,000 drachmas from his teammate Stelios Manolas, betting that AEK would win the championship in the end of the season, where Manolas did not expect that AEK would succeed and naturally lost the bet. He left AEK in 1989 in a bad way, having complaints mainly from the president of the club, Stratos Gidopoulos, as well as the manager, Dušan Bajević, since his contract was not renewed and at the same time the management owed him money, making an appeal and staying out of matches for a long time. He then played for 3 seasons in the second division with E.A. Rethymniakou, before ending his career in 1992.

International career
Pittas was called in Greece U18 in 1976 where he got to play to the final stage of the European Championship in 1977. In 1977 he was also called to the national amateur team, where he played in the qualification stage of the UEFA Amateur Cup, where Greece qualified undefeated and eventually lost the trophy at the final, in Karaiskakis Stadium, to Yugoslavia.

After football
He has been a police officer since 1982 for years he was also the leader of the Greek military team, while after the end of his career he also involved in coaching at an amateur level.

Honours

AEK Athens 
Alpha Ethniki: 1988–89

Korinthos
Beta Ethniki: 1978–79 (South Group)

References

1958 births
Living people
Super League Greece players
Korinthos F.C. players
Ethnikos Piraeus F.C. players
PAOK FC players
AEK Athens F.C. players
Association football midfielders
Footballers from Athens
Greek footballers